The Sligo, Leitrim and Northern Counties Railway (SL&NCR) was a  railway in counties Cavan, Fermanagh, Leitrim and Sligo in north-west Ireland. It consisted of one main line, with no branch lines and remained privately owned until its closure.

History

From the time that the Londonderry and Enniskillen Railway (L&ER) was completed in 1859 there was a number of proposals to connect the line with Sligo. A "Londonderry, Enniskillen and Sligo Railway" was proposed that would have run west from  via Manorhamilton direct to Sligo.

The SL&NCR Company was incorporated in 1875, and its construction started at a junction with the Great Northern Railway (GNR) at Enniskillen and proceeded westwards. The E&BR accepted defeat and in 1878 Parliament passed an Act allowing it to abandon its commitment to extend to Sligo from Bundoran. The SL&NCR adopted as its company seal a picture of two steam locomotives colliding, with one derailed and the other remaining on the track. This commemorated the SL&NCR's success in reaching Sligo and the E&BR's failure to do the same.

Beyond Carrignagat Junction the SL&NCR exercised running powers over the MGWR to and from Sligo.

In 1895 the Waterford, Limerick and Western Railway (WL&WR) was extended to Collooney, forming junctions with the MGWR and SL&NCR. This gave access to a larger area of western Ireland, whose cattle exports formed a significant part of the SL&NCR's traffic.

The SL&NCR was one of the railways that the Irish Free State's Great Southern Railways did not absorb in 1925 because it crossed the border with Northern Ireland. It became the last privately owned railway undertaking to survive in Ireland (although the Londonderry and Lough Swilly Railway still existed as a road transport firm).

The company never prospered since the countryside it crossed was poor and sparsely populated, although at one time intermittent heavy cattle traffic used the line. Governments on both sides of the border subsidised the railway in its later years, but the SL&NCR closed on 1 October 1957 as a result of the Government of Northern Ireland making the GNR Board close its line through Enniskillen.

Motive power
SL&NCR locomotives had names, but were not numbered.

Pioneer and Sligo
Its first two main line locomotives were a pair with an 0-6-2T wheel arrangement, Pioneer and Sligo, built by the Avonside Engine Company of Bristol, England and delivered in 1877. These were unsteady riders on the SL&NCR's light track, but the company kept them in service until 1921.

Leitrim class

After the disappointment of the Pioneer class, the SL&NCR turned to the 0-6-4T wheel arrangement. In 1879 Beyer, Peacock and Company of Gorton Foundry, Manchester, England had supplied the South Australian Railways K class, which was built to the Irish gauge and designed to run on lightweight track. As a result, the SL&NCR ordered an enlarged version of this design which became the SLNCR Leitrim class. Beyer, Peacock delivered the first two of this class, Fermanagh and Leitrim, in 1882. Proving reliable, the SL&NCR obtained further examples from Beyer, Peacock in 1895, Hazelwood and 1899, Lissadell The SL&NCR started withdrawing the class from service in 1947 and one of the class survived until the closure of the line in 1957.

Sir Henry class
In 1904 Beyer, Peacock delivered Sir Henry, an enlarged and modernised 0-6-4T design, the SLNCR Sir Henry class. Enniskillen was delivered in 1905 and "Lough Gill" in 1917. All three survived until the closure of the line in 1957.

Lough class

Further enlargement and modernisation of the design resulted in the SLNCR Lough class. There were only two locomotives of this type, Lough Melvin and Lough Erne, and they were built by Beyer, Peacock in 1949. When the line was closed in 1957 they were sold to the Ulster Transport Authority (UTA), with whom they remained in service until the 1960s. One of them, Lough Erne, is now preserved by the Railway Preservation Society of Ireland at Whitehead, County Antrim.

Railbuses and railcars
The SL&NCR was an early adopter of railbuses and railcars, which it introduced in the 1930s and 1940s. One of the latter, Railcar B, was built in 1947 and is now preserved by the Downpatrick and County Down Railway at Downpatrick.

References

Sources and further reading

External links

Railway companies established in 1875
Railway companies disestablished in 1957
Irish gauge railways
Closed railways in Ireland
Closed railways in Northern Ireland
Transport in County Cavan
Transport in County Fermanagh
Transport in County Leitrim
Transport in County Sligo
Railway lines opened in 1879
Defunct railway companies of Ireland